Frade is a surname. Notable people with the surname include:

Carlos Frade (born 1974), Spanish basketball manager
Henrique Frade (1934–2004), Brazilian footballer
Julio Frade (born 1943), Uruguayan pianist, actor, comedian and radio host
Leo Frade (born 1943), Cuban-born American Episcopal bishop
Ramón Frade (1875–1954), Puerto Rican visual artist and architect